Pine Grove (formerly Cobb) was a resort in Lake County, California.

References

Further reading

 

Unincorporated communities in Lake County, California